Gypsy is a census-designated place (CDP) in Harrison County, West Virginia, United States. As of the 2010 census, its population was 328.

History
A post office called Gypsy has been in operation since 1900. The community was named for a band of Roma which once camped in the area, according to local history. Gypsy was located on the Baltimore and Ohio Railroad.

References

Census-designated places in Harrison County, West Virginia
Census-designated places in West Virginia
Historic Romani communities
Romani in the United States